Rajinder Kumar Dhanger (born 4 October 1961) is an Indian judoka. He competed in the men's middleweight event at the 1992 Summer Olympics.

References

1961 births
Living people
Indian male judoka
Olympic judoka of India
Judoka at the 1992 Summer Olympics
Place of birth missing (living people)
Commonwealth Games medallists in judo
Commonwealth Games bronze medallists for India
Judoka at the 1990 Commonwealth Games
20th-century Indian people
Medallists at the 1990 Commonwealth Games